The Dacia Sandero is a subcompact car/supermini (B-segment) car produced and marketed jointly by the French manufacturer Renault and its Romanian subsidiary Dacia since 2007, currently at its third generation. It has been also marketed as the Renault Sandero in certain markets, such as Russia, Latin America, Iran, Egypt, and Sub-Saharan Africa.



First generation (B90; 2008)

With a slightly shorter wheelbase than the sedan from which it derives, the Sandero was developed at Renault's Technocentre near Paris, France, in conjunction with the regional engineering centers based in Brazil and Romania. It was revealed for the first time at the 2007 Frankfurt Motor Show, and made its formal market debut in Brazil, as a Renault model, in December 2007, being the first Renault model to debut outside Europe.

It was launched subsequently in Europe as a Dacia model at the Geneva Motor Show in March 2008. Renault began manufacturing the Sandero in South Africa in February 2009, and in December 2009, in Russia. A Renault version is also manufactured in Colombia for its home market and for export to countries including Chile.

Facelift
In May 2011, Renault launched in Brazil a facelifted version of Sandero, which enjoys a new face and a revised interior.

In Colombia, the facelifted versions of the Renault Sandero and the Renault Stepway were revealed at the beginning of 2012 with some differences from the other versions sold, such as the location of the doors locks and the passenger's airbag.

Safety
On the passive safety front, Sandero has been designed to meet the requirements of European regulations. Depending on equipment level, Dacia Sandero comes with up to four airbags. In terms of active safety Dacia Sandero features the latest generation Bosch 8.1 ABS which incorporates EBD and EBA (emergency brake assist).

The Sandero in its most basic Latin American configuration with no airbags received 1 star for adult occupants and 2 stars for toddlers from Latin NCAP in 2012.

Euro NCAP in 2008 rated the Dacia Sandero fitted with the basic level of safety equipment and also crash tested the car equipped with the 'safety pack', which is standard on some variants, and optional on others. The crash test for basic level Dacia Sandero equipped with front seat belt load limiters, driver frontal airbag and front passenger frontal airbag, scored 3 stars for adults, 4 stars for children occupants and 1 star for pedestrians.

 Adult Occupant: , score 25
 Child Occupant: , score 38
 Pedestrian: , score 6

The EuroNCAP 2008 test for the 'safety pack' model equipped with side body and head airbags and front seatbelt pretensioners, received a score of 31 for adults, 38 for children occupants and 6 for pedestrians, these results being rated as 4 from 5 stars for adults and children occupants.

 Adult Occupant: , score 31
 Child Occupant: , score 38
 Pedestrian: , score 6

Engines

Sandero Stepway
Renault do Brasil, which is the Brazilian subsidiary of French car manufacturer Renault, released in October 2008 the Sandero-based crossover Stepway, ten months after launching the Sandero brand there. The Brazilian Stepway has a 1.6 litre  16 valve engine, the Hi-Flex one with bio-ethanol abilities, and it is marketed in Brazil, Colombia, Argentina and Mexico.

The European version, unveiled on May 7, 2009, at the Barcelona International Motor Show under the Dacia brand, is available in most of the European markets as of September 2009. Dacia Sandero Stepway comes with a 1.6 litre and  petrol engine or 1.5 dCi  diesel engine.

Second generation (B52; 2012)

The second generation Sandero was designed by Joseph Ellis and was revealed by Dacia at the 2012 Paris Motor Show. The new Stepway variant was also presented. The hatchback model and the mini crossover version were spotted covered in camouflage during 2012, in the months of June, July, and September, and CGI impressions of the new model were released by car magazines Auto Bild and Za Rulem.

Official photos with the new Sandero were released by Dacia on 17 September 2012, showing an exterior design theme similar to the new Logan and a dashboard inspired from Lodgy.

Marketing and production
In Romania, the new Sandero and Sandero Stepway could be ordered from 1 October 2012. It also became available in the United Kingdom, where it joined the Duster in dealerships from 2013, being the most affordable car on the market.

In June 2014, it was launched as the new Renault Sandero in Brazil, where it is also manufactured for the South American markets. Sales in Russia began in September 2014, the Sandero being locally assembled at the AvtoVAZ plant.

The current Sandero model (produced from 2012) is produced in Mioveni, Romania (near Pitesti) for RHD markets such as United Kingdom, Ireland, Cyprus and South Africa (as Renault Sandero), it is also produced in Algeria by Renault Algeria since beginning of 2016 for the local market (only the Stepway version).

Safety
In May 2013, the second generation Dacia Sandero achieved a four star Euro NCAP overall rating for basic level, improving on the previous basic model's three star score.

The car received a score of 29 points (80%) for adults, 39 points (79%) for children occupants, 21 points (57%) for pedestrians and 5 points (55%) for safety assist, these results being rated as 5/5 stars for adult and child occupant protections, and 4/5 stars for pedestrian protection and safety assist.

 Adult Occupant: 
 Child Occupant: 
 Pedestrian: 
 Safety Assist: 

The Renault Sandero has optional rear disc brakes.

The Sandero for Africa received 3 stars for adult occupants and 4 stars for toddlers from Global NCAP in 2017 (similar to Latin NCAP 2013).

The Sandero in its most basic Latin American configuration with 2 airbags and no ESC received 1 star for adult occupants and 3 stars for toddlers from Latin NCAP in 2018 (one level above 2010-2015).

The Sandero in its most basic Latin American configuration with 4 airbags and no ESC received 1 star for adult occupants and 4 stars for toddlers from Latin NCAP in 2019.

The updated Sandero in its most basic Latin American configuration received 3 stars for adult occupants and 4 stars for toddlers from Latin NCAP in 2019.

Engines

Stepway
A crossover-look version of the Sandero dubbed the Sandero Stepway continued for the second generation. It features raised ride height, grey plastic side skirts, overfenders, and a crossover-look bumpers. It is available both under the Dacia brand and Renault brand for Latin American markets. Starting from 2020, the Stepway is marketed as a separate model from the Sandero in Latin America.

Sandero R.S. 2.0

In August 2014, Renault Sport CEO Patrice Ratti revealed to the Autocar magazine that a hot hatch R.S. version of Sandero was in the works, following development mules being spotted in early to mid 2015. It was released in September 2015 in Brazil, different from the normal versions with three types of ECU control: normal, sport and sport+, four disc brakes with ABS, a steering wheel taken from the Clio R.S., electronic stability program and a six speed manual transmission.

It later came in Mexico on 21 October 2019.

The Sandero RS is discontinued at the end of 2021 because of Brazilian emissions standards.

Facelift
The revised Dacia Sandero was released in November 2016 at the 2016 Paris Motor Show. On the outside, the facelifted version comes with LED daytime running lights and restyled taillights. Dacia has also updated its engine range with a 1.0-litre 3-cylinder petrol that sits in the entry-level trims, replacing the old 1.2-litre unit.

Another facelift was announced in July 2019, to be introduced for the following model year, but only for the Renault-badged model, produced in Brazil. This upgrade brings a slightly revised front end and a more significantly redesigned rear end. While the front end is identical with the facelifted Romanian or Moroccan-built Renault Sandero sold in regions outside Latin America, the rear end is majorly revised with the rear tail lights extends to the tailgate. This facelift is not sold in Mexico since it was replaced by the Kwid hatchback and therefore the Stepway and R.S. versions of the Sandero are only sold.

Awards and reception
In January 2013, British magazine What Car? awarded the second generation Sandero as the Best supermini less than £12,000, noting that "it offers something genuinely new and different in that it brings real space for bargain prices". What Car? awarded the Sandero again in 2014 and 2015.

Auto Express assessed a 4 out of 5 to the Sandero Stepway.

Third generation (DJF/BJI cross; 2020)

The third generation of Dacia Sandero and Sandero Stepway was launched together with the new Dacia Logan III, on 29 September 2020. The car is based on the low-spec version of the CMF-B platform and was presented on 7 September 2020.

The new Sandero is exclusively available with three-cylinder engines. The more powerful version of the engine, badged as ECO-G 100 Bi-Fuel received  and a 6-speed manual transmission.

The lower-spec cars get a modular multimedia system dubbed "Media Control" with removable smartphone support while the upper trims have an integrated 8-inch touchscreen with support for Android Auto and Apple CarPlay.

It is also equipped with electric power steering, LED headlights, emergency brake assist, blind-spot warning, park assist (with front and rear sensors, rearview camera), hill start assist, keyless entry, heated front seats, automatic air conditioning with digital display, reverse camera, electric parking brake, automatic wipers, a remote trunk release and electric glass sunroof as standard or optional, depending on the market.

Restyle

In June 2022, the Sandero received a slight restyling incorporating the brand's new logo alongside other Dacia models. To accommodate the new logo, the grille is redesigned, and the steering wheel is slightly modified.

Engines

Sandero

Stepway
A crossover-look version of the Sandero dubbed the Sandero Stepway continued for the third generation. The TCe 110 engine from the Dacia Jogger is also available exclusively on the Sandero Stepway.

Renault Sandero
The Sandero, along with the Logan, was due to launch in Russia in 2022, but this was never completed due to the ongoing war. However, some camouflaged prototypes were photographed at the former Renault factory in Moscow, now Moskvitch.

Safety

Euro NCAP
In 2021, the Dacia Sandero Stepway in its standard European configuration obtained 2 stars from Euro NCAP.

Top Gear 
The Sandero was the focus of a running joke on the British television programme Top Gear. In Series 11 and Series 12, after Dacia sent the show a press kit, presenter James May would often exclaim "Good News!" and explain a fact about the Sandero during the show's news segment, to which Jeremy Clarkson would reply "Great!" before abruptly changing the subject.

The joke was also featured in The Big Book of Top Gear, with a page proclaiming "Good News! The Dacia Sandero is in this book!" In later episodes, the presenters switched sides of the joke, with Clarkson bringing up news about the car and May shrugging it off. In the first episode of Series 13, when May said he had "Good News", Clarkson immediately asked "Is it the Dacia Sandero?", to which a seemingly bewildered May replied, "No..." The car was not mentioned for the remainder of the series.

In Series 14, during a visit to Romania, Clarkson bought May a used Sandero as a gift. After returning from a test drive, May parked the car behind an idling lorry, and exited. As May praised the car to his co-presenters, the lorry reversed into the Sandero, damaging the passenger side. The joke was continued in Series 15, except this time referring to the Dacia Duster, and in Series 18, when May brought up the new Dacia Lodgy. The joke returned in the first and third episodes of Series 19, as well as the second and fifth episodes of Series 20.

The second generation Sandero was featured alongside the Ford Fiesta and Volkswagen Up! in series 21 as part of a 1.0-liter, three-cylinder cars challenge, which ended with Clarkson (Up!) and May (Sandero) having to drive into the abandoned city of Pripyat, with Hammond's Fiesta having already run out of fuel. The Sandero was the only car to make it back out and complete all the challenges. (Technically, the challenge was to run out of fuel before reaching Pripyat, so Hammond in his Fiesta was successful at this last challenge.) May pointed out the large price difference between the Fiesta and the Sandero, stating that at £17,500 Vs £7,500 he could afford to lose his car, buy another - and still be better off than Hammond.

Despite the comical and sarcastic nature of the recurring bit, May has stated that he has a genuine affinity for the Sandero. According to some sources, its second generation was intended to become a third Reasonably Priced Car on Top Gear, however its use was prevented due to its delayed release in Britain.

Sales

Notes

References

External links

Official Dacia Sandero website
Official Sandero Stepway website

Sandero
Cars of Argentina
Cars of Brazil
Cars of Romania
Front-wheel-drive vehicles
Euro NCAP superminis
Global NCAP superminis
Latin NCAP superminis
Subcompact cars
Hatchbacks
Mini sport utility vehicles
Cars introduced in 2007
Flexible-fuel vehicles
2000s cars
2010s cars
2020s cars
Vehicles with CVT transmission